Mildred Clary (7 February 1931 – 19 November 2010) was a French radio and television producer as well as a music writer.

Biography 
Mildred Clary (born as Mildred Kennard. Her father was the guitarist Deric Kennard) was born in Paris in a music lover family. Her English father made her discover the wealth of ancient lute music and her French mother was a pianist, a pupil of Ricardo Viñes and Marguerite Long. But she did not put herself to music until late. She began her career as a concertmaster on guitar and later on lute and played incidental music in the pit of The Old Vic Theatre of London.

She decided to leave England and settle in France. She asked the director of the Old Vic for recommendations to French directors. The latter sent him to Jean Vilar and Jean-Louis Barrault, who both hired her. For in the 1950s, she was one of the few in France to play the lute at a time when few factors were making such instruments. She met Countess Thibault de Chambure, founder of the "Société de musique d'autrefois" and future curator of the instruments museum of the Conservatoire de Paris, who lent her an original old instrument of her rich personal collection. Mildred Clary played under the direction of Pierre Boulez and Hermann Scherchen at the Domaine musical and participated in many stage music as lutist for Jean Vilar. In 1956, she recorded the hommage Le Tombeau de Claude Debussy, by Manuel de Falla, reissued in the anthology box set Les Introuvables de Manuel de Falla (EMI, 1996). During the 1950s and 1960s, she also made different recordings of early music for the lute, in solo or with singers (notably with the vocal ensembles of Philippe Caillard and Roger Blanchard, and with tenor Yves Tessier and soprano Chanterelle Lanza del Vasto for the records companies Erato Records, Ducretet-Thomson, Vega and ). In them, she displayed a very fine musical sensitivity.

In 1955, she became a producer of radio broadcasts for French radio and subsequently for France Culture and France Musique. She first produced a series entitled Poète prends ton luth ("Poet, take your lute") in which she intervened as an instrumentalist. She then abandoned the instrument for "physiological reasons" (joint and back pain), as she confided to Olivier Germain-Thomas on the programme "For intérieur", for France culture, aired in 2005) to focus only on the broadcasts she now hosted. The first series of the very numerous ones she produced on radio was Musica britannica. She was interested in the music of India (a country she loved and often visited) and Japan as well as composers of the twentieth century such as Jean Sibelius, Benjamin Britten, Olivier Greif, and conductors, great performers and music venues in Europe and around the world. She conducted interviews with painters, such as Jean Bazaine, or produced a culinary series entitled les Mets et les notes, for France musique, whose guests realized recipes in real time (cooking or preparation being "filled" by music related to the gastronomic theme).

On television, she notably produced Un ton au-dessus ("One Tone Above"), for the first channel of the Office de Radiodiffusion Télévision Française (1972–1973), La musique buissonnière, for France 3 (1975 to 1977), La Leçon de musique for TF1 (1976 to 1982) and Opus, for Arte (1989 to 1996). Her field of interest was very wide, Indian music (the great Indian filmmaker Satyajit Ray directed his Music lesson on music from northern India) to contemporary western music, jazz.

Claude Samuel, also a producer at France Musique, who was Director of Music at Radio France, recalls that during the Mozart year, she provided a daily program of which a CD was born, Mozart - la traversée ultime ("Mozart - The Ultimate Crossing"). She asked that a sentence by the Swiss theologian Karl Barth be inscribed on the CD cover: 

Claude Samuel emphasizes in his homage, where he evokes 

Her colleague Renaud Machart paid hommage to Mildred Clary during a series Grandes figures ("Big Figures") from 20 to 24 December 2010 on France Musique.

Works 
 2000: Georg Friedrich Haendel, with Jean-Claude Donda, illustré par Charlotte Voake - Gallimard Jeunesse/ Erato 
 2002: Madeleine Milhaud - Mon XXe 
 2005: George Gershwin - Une rhapsodie américaine, - Pygmalion 
 2006: Benjamin Britten ou le mythe de l'enfance, - Buchet/Chastel 
 2006: Mozart : La lumière de Dieu, with René de Obaldia 
 2011: Hommage au pianiste catalan Ricardo Viñes (1875-1943) for Actes Sud

Distinctions 
1988 : Grand Prix de la radio, by the Société des gens de lettres

Hommages 
 Culture Minister Frédéric Mitterrand paid tribute to her by saying

References

External links 
 Mildred Clary on Babelio
 Mildred Clary on ResMusica
 Mildred Clary Obituary on Le Monde (27 Nov. 2010)
 Mildred Clary on Mediapart
 Mildred Clary on Who's Who

1931 births
2010 deaths
Writers from Paris
French lutenists
20th-century French musicologists
21st-century French musicologists
Women musicologists
French radio producers
French television producers
Women television producers
Women radio producers